Blake Edwards (born William Blake Crump; July 26, 1922 – December 15, 2010) was an American film director, producer, screenwriter and actor.

Edwards began his career in the 1940s as an actor, but he soon began writing screenplays and radio scripts before turning to producing and directing in television and films. His best-known films include Breakfast at Tiffany's (1961), Days of Wine and Roses (1962), The Great Race (1965), 10 (1979), Victor/Victoria (1982), and the hugely successful Pink Panther film series with British actor Peter Sellers. Often thought of as primarily a director of comedies, he also directed several drama, musical, and detective films. Late in his career, he took up writing, producing and directing for theater.

In 2004, he received an Honorary Academy Award in recognition of his writing, directing and producing an extraordinary body of work for the screen.

Early life
Born William Blake Crump July 26, 1922, in Tulsa, Oklahoma, he was the son of Donald and Lillian (Grommett) Crump (1897–1992). His father reportedly left the family before he was born. His mother married again, to Jack McEdward, who became his stepfather. McEdward was the son of J. Gordon Edwards, a director of silent movies, and in 1925, he moved the family to Los Angeles and became a film production manager. In an interview with The Village Voice in 1971, Blake Edwards said that he had "always felt alienated, estranged from my own father, Jack McEdward". After graduating from Beverly Hills High School in the class of Winter 1941, Blake began taking jobs as an actor during World War II.

Edwards describes this period:
I worked with the best directors – Ford, Wyler, Preminger – and learned a lot from them. But I wasn't a very cooperative actor. I was a spunky, smart-assed kid. Maybe even then I was indicating that I wanted to give, not take, direction.

Edwards served in the United States Coast Guard during World War II, where he suffered a severe back injury, which left him in pain for years afterwards.

Career
Edwards's debut as a director came in 1952 on the television program Four Star Playhouse.

In the 1954–1955 television season, Edwards joined with Richard Quine to create Mickey Rooney's first television series, The Mickey Rooney Show: Hey, Mulligan. Edwards's hard-boiled private detective scripts for Richard Diamond, Private Detective became NBC's answer to Sam Spade and Philip Marlowe, reflecting Edwards's unique humor. Edwards also created, wrote, and directed the 1958-61 TV detective series Peter Gunn, which starred Craig Stevens, with music by Henry Mancini. The following year, Edwards produced Mr. Lucky, an adventure series on CBS starring John Vivyan and Ross Martin. Mancini's association with Edwards continued in his film work, significantly contributing to their success.

Edwards's most popular films were comedies, the melodrama Days of Wine and Roses being a notable exception. His most dynamic and successful collaboration was with Peter Sellers in six of the movies in the Pink Panther series. Edwards later directed the comedy film 10 with Dudley Moore and Bo Derek.

Operation Petticoat (1959)
Operation Petticoat was Edwards's first big-budget movie as a director. The film, which starred Cary Grant and Tony Curtis and was produced by Grant's own production company, Granart Company, became the "greatest box-office success of the decade for Universal [Studios]" and made Edwards a recognized director.

Breakfast at Tiffany's (1961)
Breakfast at Tiffany's, based on the novella by Truman Capote, is credited with establishing him as a "cult figure" with many critics. Andrew Sarris called it the "directorial surprise of 1961", and it became a "romantic touchstone" for college students in the early 1960s.

Days of Wine and Roses (1962)
Days of Wine And Roses, a dark psychological film about the effects of alcoholism on a previously happy marriage, starred Jack Lemmon and Lee Remick. It has been described as "perhaps the most unsparing tract against drink that Hollywood has yet produced, more pessimistic than Billy Wilder's The Lost Weekend". The film gave another major boost to Edwards's reputation as an important director.

Darling Lili (1970)
Whilst some critics, such as George Morris, thought that the film was a major picture ("it synthesizes every major Edwards theme: the disappearance of gallantry and honor, the tension between appearances and reality, and the emotional, spiritual, moral, and psychological disorder" in such a world, not all agreed. However, Edwards used complex cinematography techniques, including long-shot zooms, tracking, and focus distortion, to great effect."), but the film failed badly with most critics and at the box office. Despite a cost of $17 million to make, it was seen by few cinema-goers, and the few who did watch were unimpressed. It brought Paramount Pictures to "the verge of financial collapse", and became an example of "self-indulgent extravagance" in filmmaking "that was ruining Hollywood". 

Darling Lili star Julie Andrews had married Edwards in 1969.

Pink Panther film series
Edwards also directed most of the comedy film series The Pink Panther, the majority of installments starring Peter Sellers as the inept Inspector Clouseau. The relationship between the director and the lead actor was considered a fruitful yet complicated one with many disagreements during production. At various times in their film relationship, "he more than once swore off Sellers" as too hard to direct. However, in his later years, he admitted that working with Sellers was often irresistible:
We clicked on comedy and we were lucky we found each other because we both had so much respect for it. We also had an ability to come up with funny things and great situations that had to be explored. But in that exploration there would often times be disagreement. But I couldn't resist those moments when we gelled. And if you ask me who contributed most to those things, it couldn't have happened unless both of us were involved, even though it wasn't always happy.

Five of those films involved Edwards and Sellers in original material; those films being The Pink Panther (1963), A Shot in the Dark (1964), The Return of the Pink Panther (1975), The Pink Panther Strikes Again (1976), and Revenge of the Pink Panther (1978). (1968's Inspector Clouseau, the third film in the series, was made without the involvement of Edwards or Sellers.) The films were all highly profitable: The Return of the Pink Panther, for example, cost just $2.5 million to make but grossed $100 million, while The Pink Panther Strikes Again did even better.

After Sellers's death in 1980, Edwards directed three further Pink Panther films. Trail of the Pink Panther (1982) consisted of unused material of Sellers from The Pink Panther Strikes Again as well as previously seen material from the earlier films. Curse of the Pink Panther (1983) and Son of the Pink Panther (1993) were further attempts by Edwards to continue the series without Sellers but both films were critical and financial disappointments. Edwards eventually retired from film making two years after the release of Son of the Pink Panther.

In addition to the Pink Panther films, Edwards directed Sellers in the comedy film The Party.

Awards
In 2004, Edwards received an Honorary Academy Award for cumulative achievements over the course of his film career. As Entertainment Weekly reported, "Honorary Oscar winner Blake Edwards made an entrance worthy of Peter Sellers in one of Edwards' Pink Panther films: A stuntman who looked just like Edwards rode a speeding wheelchair past a podium and crashed through a wall. When the octogenarian director entered and dusted himself off as if he had crashed, he told presenter Jim Carrey, 'Don’t touch my Oscar.'"

Also in 2004, Edwards received The Life Career Award from the Academy of Science Fiction, Fantasy and Horror Films, during that year's Saturn Award ceremony.

In 2002, Edwards received the Laurel Award for Screenwriting Achievement from the Writers Guild as well as the Special Edgar from The Mystery Writers of America for career achievement.

In 2000, Edwards received the Contribution to Cinematic Imagery Award from the Art Directors Guild.

In 1993, Edwards received the Preston Sturges Award jointly from the Directors Guild and the Writers Guild.

In 1991, Edwards received a star on the Hollywood Walk of Fame.

In 1988, Edwards received the Creative Achievement Award from the American Comedy Awards.

In 1983, Edwards was nominated for an Academy Award for Best Screenplay for Victor/Victoria as well as winning Best Foreign Film and Best Foreign Screenplay in France and Italy, respectively for Victor/Victoria

Between 1962 and 1968, Edwards was nominated six times for a Golden Laurel Award as Best Director by Motion Picture Exhibitors.

In 1963, Edwards was nominated for a Golden Globe as Best Director for Days of Wine and Roses

In 1962, Edwards was nominated for Outstanding Achievement by the Directors Guild for Breakfast at Tiffany's

In 1960, Edwards was nominated for an Edgar for Best Teleplay by the Mystery Writers of America for Peter Gunn

In 1959, Edwards was nominated for two Primetime Emmys as Best Director and Best Teleplay for Peter Gunn

Between 1958 and 1983, Edwards was nominated eight times for Best Screenplay by the Writers Guild and won twice, for The Pink Panther Strikes Again and Victor/Victoria

Silent-film style
Having grown up in Hollywood, the stepson of a studio production manager and stepgrandson of a silent-film director, Edwards had watched the films of the great silent-era comedians, including Charlie Chaplin, Buster Keaton, Harold Lloyd, and Laurel and Hardy. He and Sellers appreciated and understood the comedy styles in silent films and tried to recreate them in their work together. After their immense success with the first two Pink Panther films, The Pink Panther (1963) and A Shot in the Dark (1964), which adapted many silent-film aspects, including slapstick, they attempted to go even further in The Party (1968). The film has always had a cult following, and some critics and fans have considered it a "masterpiece in this vein" of silent comedy, though it did include minimal dialogue.

Personal life
Edwards married his first wife, actress Patricia Walker, in 1953; they divorced in 1967. Edwards and Walker had two children, actress Jennifer Edwards and actor-writer-director Geoffrey Edwards. Walker appeared in the comedy All Ashore (1953), for which Edwards was one of the screenwriters. Edwards also named one of his film production companies, Patricia Productions, Incorporated, after her.

Edwards's second marriage, from 1969 until his death in 2010, was to Julie Andrews. They were married for 41 years. He was the stepfather to Emma, from Andrews's previous marriage. In the 1970s, Edwards and Andrews adopted two Vietnamese daughters; Amy Leigh (later known as Amelia) in 1974 and Joanna Lynne in 1975.

Edwards described his struggle for 15 years with the illness chronic fatigue syndrome in the documentary I Remember Me (2000).

Death
On December 15, 2010, Edwards died of complications of pneumonia at the Saint John's Health Center in Santa Monica, California. He was 88.

Legacy
Edwards was greatly admired, and criticized, as a filmmaker. His critics are alluded to by American film author George Morris:
It has been difficult for many critics to accept Blake Edwards as anything more than a popular entertainer. Edwards' detractors acknowledge his formal skill, but deplore the absence of profundity in his movies. Edwards' movies are slick and glossy, but their shiny surfaces reflect all too accurately the disposable values of contemporary life.

Others, however, recognized him more for his significant achievements at different periods of his career. British film critic Peter Lloyd, for example, described Edwards, in 1971, as "the finest director working in the American commercial cinema at the present time". Edwards's biographers, William Luhr and Peter Lehman, in an interview in 1974, called him "the finest American director working at this time". They refer especially to the Pink Panther’s Clouseau, developed with the comedic skills of Peter Sellers as a character "perfectly consistent" with his "absurdist view of the world, because he has no faith in anything and constantly adapts". Critic Stuart Byron calls his first two Pink Panther films "two of the best comedies an American has ever made". Polls taken at the time showed that his name, as a director, was a rare "marketable commodity" in Hollywood.

Edwards himself described one of the secrets to success in the film industry:
For someone who wants to practice his art in this business, all you can hope to do, as S.O.B. says, is stick to your guns, make the compromises you must, and hope that somewhere along the way you acquire a few good friends who understand. And keep half a conscience.

Filmography

Films as director

Other films 
{| class="wikitable"
!Year
!Title
!Notes
|-
|1946
|The Strange Love of Martha Ivers
|actor - hitchhiker
|-
|1948
|Panhandle
|rowspan="2" | co-screenwriter and co-producer
|-
|1949
|Stampede
|-
|rowspan="2" |1952
|Sound Off
|rowspan="2" | co-screenwriter
|-
|Rainbow 'Round My Shoulder 
|-
|rowspan="2" | 1953
|All Ashore 
|shared story credit and co-screenwriter
|-
|Cruisin' Down the River 
|rowspan="2" |co-screenwriter 
|-
|rowspan="2" | 1954
|Drive a Crooked Road 
|-
|The Atomic Kid 
|story credit
|-
|1955
|My Sister Eileen 
|rowspan="2" |co-screenwriter 
|-
|1957
|Operation Mad Ball 
|-
|rowspan="2" | 1962
|The Couch 
|shared story credit
|-
|The Notorious Landlady 
|co-screenwriter
|-
|1963
|Soldier in the Rain 
|co-screenwriter and production company
|-
|1967
|Waterhole No. 3 
|production company
|-
|1968
|Inspector Clouseau
|developed screenplay
|-
|1984
|City Heat 
|story credit and co-screenwriter
|}

Television creditsInvitation Playhouse (1952 anthology series) [writer] Four Star Playhouse (1952–1956 anthology series; includes the recurring "Dante's Inferno" segments) [writer and director]City Detective (1953–1955 police drama) [associate producer and director]The Mickey Rooney Show (1954–1955 sitcom) [co-creator]Mickey Spillane's Mike Hammer (1954 pilot) [writer and director]The Pepsi-Cola Playhouse (1954 anthology series featured unsold pilot for "Barrie Craig, Confidential Investigator") [writer and director]The Lineup (1954–1956 police drama) [writer]The Star and the Story (1955 anthology series) [director]Fireside Theatre (1955 anthology series) [writer and director] Chevron Hall of Stars (1956 anthology series featuring pilot for "Richard Diamond, Private Detective") [creator]Ford Television Theatre (1956 anthology series featuring unsold pilot for "Johnny Abel") [writer]Studio 57 (1957 anthology series) [writer]Richard Diamond, Private Detective (1957–1960 detective series) [creator]Meet McGraw (1957 detective series) [writer]Peter Gunn (1958–1961 detective series) [creator, producer, writer, director, and production company]Rango (1959 unsold Western pilot) [executive producer, director, and production company]Mr. Lucky (1959–1960 adventure series) [supervising producer, writer, director, and production company]Dante (1960–1961 adventure series) [creator] The Dick Powell Show (1962 anthology series featuring first pilot for "The Boston Terrier") [executive producer, writer, director, and production company]Johnny Dollar (1962 unsold detective pilot) [writer, executive producer, director, and production company]House of Seven (1962 unsold detective pilot) [writer, executive producer, and production company]The Boston Terrier (1963 second unsold detective pilot) [creator, executive producer, and production company]The Monk (1969 detective telefilm) [story credit and production company] Casino (1980 adventure telefilm) [creative consultant and production company]The Ferret (1984 spy comedy demonstration film) [story credit, co-writer, executive producer, and production company]Justin Case (1988 detective comedy telefilm) [shared story credit, writer, executive producer, director, and production company] Peter Gunn (1989 detective telefilm) [creator, writer, executive producer, director, and production company] Julie (1992 sitcom) [executive producer, director, and production company] Mortal Sins (1992 detective telefilm) [production company]

Radio drama creditsHollywood Star Theatre (1948 anthology series) [writer]Richard Diamond, Private Detective (1949–1953 detective series) [creator, writer, director] Broadway is My Beat (1950 police drama) [writer]The Lineup (1950–1952 police drama) [writer] Yours Truly, Johnny Dollar (1951–1953 detective series) [writer] Suspense (1951 anthology series) [writer]

Theater creditsVictor/Victoria (1995–1999 Broadway production and Broadway tour) [writer, executive producer, director, and production company]Big Rosemary (1999 off-Broadway production, 2004 theatrical workshop, 2008 Broadway preview) [writer, executive producer, director, and production company] Scapegoat'' (2003 theatrical workshop) [writer, executive producer, director, and production company]

References

External links

 Senses of Cinema: Great Directors Critical Database
 
 
 
 
 Encyclopedia of Oklahoma History and Culture – Edwards, Blake
My Day With Blake Edwards – A Tribute by Steven Ameche

 

1922 births
2010 deaths
20th-century American male actors
20th-century American male writers
20th-century American writers
21st-century American writers
Academy Honorary Award recipients
American comedy writers
American film directors
American male film actors
American male screenwriters
American male television writers
American television writers
César Award winners
Comedy film directors
Curtleigh Productions
Deaths from pneumonia in California
Edgar Award winners
Film producers from Oklahoma
Male actors from Tulsa, Oklahoma
People with chronic fatigue syndrome
Screenwriters from Oklahoma
United States Coast Guard personnel of World War II
Writers from Tulsa, Oklahoma
Writers Guild of America Award winners